Lamplugh is a surname, and may refer to:

 George William Lamplugh (1859–1926), British geologist
 Kenneth Edward Norman Lamplugh (1901–1979), Anglican bishop
 Suzy Lamplugh (1961–1993), British murder victim
 Thomas Lamplugh (1615–1691), English clergyman
 Thomas Lamplugh (1656–1737), MP for Cockermouth (UK Parliament constituency), 1702–1708